Achères is a commune in the Cher department in the Centre-Val de Loire region of France.

Geography

Population

Places of interest
 The church of Notre-Dame, dating from the twelfth century.

See also
Communes of the Cher department

References

External links

A photo link to the war memorial

Communes of Cher (department)